Sidney Hemming is an analytical geochemist known for her work documenting Earth's history through analysis of sediments and sedimentary rocks. She is a professor of earth and environmental sciences at Columbia University.

Education and career 

Hemming earned a BS from Midwestern University in 1983 and an MS from Tulane University in 1986. In 1994 she earned her PhD from Stony Brook where she studied lead isotopes in sedimentary rocks. In 1994, Hemming started a postdoc with Wally Broecker at  Lamont–Doherty Earth Observatory. As of 2021, Hemming is a professor of earth and environmental sciences at Lamont–Doherty Earth Observatory.

In 2018, Hemming was named a fellow of the American Geophysical Union who cited her "for the development of geochemical and isotopic tracers for sediments to reveal geological processes and events through Earth's history". In 2021, Hemming received a Guggenheim Fellowship which she plans to use to study the time period between the Pliocene and the Pleistocene.

Research 
Hemming's research documents changes in Earth's history using the chemical signals in sedimentary rocks and sediments. She uses geochronology to obtain age estimates of events occurring in the ocean thereby tracking changes in water circulation, winds, and glaciers. She has used neodymium isotopes to track rapid changes in Antarctic Intermediate Water and changes in North Atlantic Deep Water. In the southern Ocean, Hemming has used strontium isotopes in sediments to track changes in the strength of the Agulhas current during the Last Glacial Maximum and constrained the location of the Antarctic Circumpolar Current. In California, her research on past climate conditions at Mono Lake revealed chemical signatures in the sediments recorded the Laschamp event, a global geomagnetic shift. In the North Atlantic Ocean, Hemming's research on Heinrich events has constrained the amount of ice-rafted debris moved by icebergs into the North Atlantic Ocean.

Selected publications

Awards and honors 
 Fellow, American Geophysical Union (2018)
Fellow, Geological Society of America (2018)
Fellow, Geochemical Society (2020)
Guggenheim Foundation Fellow (2021)

References

External links 

Fellows of the American Geophysical Union
Midwestern State University alumni
Tulane University alumni
Stony Brook University alumni
Lamont–Doherty Earth Observatory people
Women geochemists
Paleoclimatologists
Women geologists
Columbia University faculty